Sí Podemos Canarias, was an electoral alliance formed by Yes We Can (Podemos), Yes We Can (SSP) and Equo in March 2019 ahead of the 2019 Canarian regional election.

Composition

References

Political parties established in 2019
Political parties in the Canary Islands
2019 establishments in Spain